Ain't She Tweet is a 1952 Warner Bros. Looney Tunes cartoon directed by Friz Freleng. The short was released on June 21, 1952, and stars Sylvester and Tweety Bird.

The title is a play on the song "Ain't She Sweet."

Plot
Sylvester stands outside a pet store window, watching Tweety (singing "Fiddle-De-Di") in the display area. Tweety angers Sylvester after the bird goes over to a mouse and they laugh at the cat, who throws a brick at the window in response. However, upon seeing a cop walk up behind Sylvester, the would-be feline vandal runs in front of the brick and absorbs the blow.

As Sylvester is planning to cut through the glass window with a glass cutter, a deliveryman takes Tweety away, to be delivered to Granny's house. Sylvester follows the deliveryman and rushes into the yard, only to discover a whole army of bulldogs.

The rest of the cartoon contains Sylvester's attempts (all unsuccessful) to get at Tweety:

 Sylvester uses a stick with an imitation cat on it, but the bulldogs clobber it. Then he paces to think up another plan.
 Walking across a tree branch that extends from the outside to the house. Tweety saws the branch off and Sylvester waves goodbye and falls from the tree and Tweety starts laughing. (Tweety: "That puddy tat's got a pink skin under his fur coat!"). And Sylvester closed the gate, bruised, battered and lost most of his fur from the attack.
 Using stilts to walk harmlessly above the dogs. Tweety gives the dogs some tools to cut the stilts down to size; Sylvester tries a hasty retreat but ends up just short of the gate. 
 Building a rocket, which simply sets the cat's fur on fire.
 Riding a bucket attached to a wire that he connected from a telephone pole to the edge of Granny's house. Unfortunately, Sylvester's weight is too heavy for the bucket's support, and the added weight lowers the bucket down to the horde of dogs, where they wait to beat Sylvester up.
 Waiting until the yard is empty and then walking unannounced to the house. The dogs run outside and tackle the cat. This time, Sylvester gets away, but before he can catch his breath, a kindly old man - thinking the puddy had simply wandered outside his home - throws him back into the yard (seemingly oblivious to the "Beware of Dogs" sign), where the dogs beat the cat up some more.
 Hiding in a package intended for Granny. The original contents are dog food, which has the dogs so eager. Granny does not take the package in to unwrap (as Sylvester had expected), instead she throws it to the dogs. As she watches the dogs tear open the package to get at their "food," Granny compliments on how hungry they were that she didn't have the chance to unwrap the package.

Finally, Sylvester decides to wait until the early morning to tip-toe silently through the yard. The alarm clock goes off at 4 a.m., awakening the dogs and pummeling the cat one last time.

References

External links

 
 
 Nuance and Suggestion in the Tweety and Sylvester Series -  Written by Kevin McCorry

1952 films
1952 short films
1952 comedy films
1952 animated films
1950s English-language films
1950s Warner Bros. animated short films
American animated short films
American slapstick comedy films
Looney Tunes shorts
Sylvester the Cat films
Tweety films
Animated films about dogs
Films about mice and rats
Films about pets
Works about suburbs
Animated films set in the United States
Films set in 1952
Short films directed by Friz Freleng
Films scored by Carl Stalling
Warner Bros. Cartoons animated short films